Şeref Görkey (1 January 1913 - 10 November 2004) was a Turkish footballer and manager who mainly served Turkish side Beşiktaş throughout his career. Nicknamed Voleci Şeref, literally meaning "Şeref the Volley Scorer", due to his tally of scoring 99 goals of volley shots during his career, Görkey wore number 10 shirt whilst his entire spell at Beşiktaş. He was also part of Turkey's squad at the 1936 Summer Olympics, but he did not play in any matches.

Club career
Görkey scored 320 goals during his career, where he is one of the most scoring players in fierce rivalries of Beşiktaş, scoring 30 goals to Galatasaray and 13 goals to Fenerbahçe, respectively.

Görkey managed İstanbulspor in 1972.

Career stats

International

See also
 List of one-club men

Individual
Beşiktaş J.K. Squads of Century (Bronze Team)

References

External links
 Profile at TFF 
 Biography at Beşiktaş official website 

1913 births
2004 deaths
Association football forwards
Turkish footballers
Turkey international footballers
Turkish football managers
Footballers from Istanbul
Süper Lig players
Süper Lig managers
Beşiktaş J.K. footballers
Turkey national football team managers
Beşiktaş J.K. managers
İstanbulspor managers
Footballers at the 1936 Summer Olympics
Olympic footballers of Turkey